Svabite is a arsenate mineral. The mineral is rare and is also a member of the Apatite group.

It is named in 1891 by Hjalmar Sjögren after Anton von Swab.

The mineral is isomorphous with Apatite and Mimetite.

Occurrence 
Svabite can be found in countries like Sweden or Germany.

The mineral is rare in calc-silicate skarns and arsenate analogue.

References 

Calcium minerals
Arsenate minerals
Fluorine minerals
Minerals described in 1891